The canton of Saint-Avold is an administrative division of the Moselle department, northeastern France. It was created at the French canton reorganisation which came into effect in March 2015. Its seat is in Saint-Avold.

It consists of the following communes:
 
 Altviller
 Carling
 Diesen
 Folschviller
 L'Hôpital
 Lachambre
 Macheren
 Porcelette
 Saint-Avold
 Valmont

References

Cantons of Moselle (department)